Fargo College was a coeducational institution in Fargo, North Dakota.

History
Fargo College was founded in 1888 under the auspices of the Congregational Church. At the close of 1919, there were 32 professors and instructors, and 602 students. The president of the college was W. H. Howard.  

Fargo College closed in 1922 due to financial problems.  Its buildings have mostly been demolished, except for Watson Hall (the music building). An extensive collection of the Fargo College records is held by the North Dakota State University Archives.

Notable alumni and faculty
 Mary Elizabeth Perley (1863–?), American educator and author

References

Additional sources
 
 

Defunct private universities and colleges in North Dakota
Fargo, North Dakota
Educational institutions established in 1888
1888 establishments in Dakota Territory
1922 disestablishments in North Dakota